Eugenia Paul (born Eugenia Popoff, March 3, 1935 – May 24, 2010) was an American actress and dancer best known for her role as Elena Torres in the television series Zorro, which aired on the American television network ABC.

Biography
Paul was born Eugenia Popoff in Dearborn, Michigan, of Russian heritage. She signed as a dancer with Warner Bros. when she was just 17 years old, while participating on a tour with the American Ballet Theatre and the Ballet Sketchbook television show.

Paul danced in lead roles on screen. She also studied ballet with Bronislava Nijinska and drama and acting under Michael Chekhov.  Paul departed Warner Bros. and signed with 20th Century Fox as an actor in 1955.

Her other television credits included Alfred Hitchcock Presents, Medic, The Lone Ranger, Death Valley Days, The Adventures of Jim Bowie and the Playhouse 90 adaptation of The Great Gatsby and Sky King).

Paul's film credits including Lost in Alaska, Man on the Prowl, Apache Warrior and The Ten Commandments.  Her last feature film role was in the western Gunfighters of Abilene in 1960.

Private life
Paul met her husband, Pep Boys heir Robert Strauss, at a Hollywood Bowl party.The couple married and Paul quit professional show business soon after her marriage. They remained married for 52 years, until her death in 2010.

Death
Paul died of complications of edema on May 24, 2010, at Good Samaritan Medical Center in West Palm Beach, Florida, at the age of 75.

Filmography

References

External links

1935 births
2010 deaths
American female dancers
Dancers from Michigan
American film actresses
American people of Russian descent
American television actresses
People from Dearborn, Michigan
21st-century American women